Orthaga euadrusalis, the mango leaf webber, is a species of snout moth in the genus Orthaga. It was described by Francis Walker in 1858. It is found on Borneo and in India.

The larvae feed on Mangifera indica. They web the leaves and terminal shoots of their host plant into clusters. Several larvae can be found in one single cluster. Young larvae are gregarious and feed by scraping the leaf surface. Older larvae feed individually on the whole leaf lamina, leaving only the midrib. As a consequence of severe feeding, clusters of webbed leaves become dry and brown in colour.

References

External links
 

Moths described in 1858
Epipaschiinae
Moths of Japan